"Ring My Bell" is the second single released from DJ Jazzy Jeff & The Fresh Prince's fourth studio album, Homebase. The song sampled and shared the same name as Anita Ward's 1979 hit, "Ring My Bell", though the original lyrics were replaced by those written by the Fresh Prince (Will Smith). Nevertheless, The song's original writer, Fredrick Knight was sole writer who received writing credits. The song appears on Smith's series, The Fresh Prince of Bel-Air in the closing credits from "The Mother of All Battles" off the season 2 episode.

"Ring My Bell" was the follow-up to the duo's smash hit, "Summertime", which peaked at No. 4 on the Billboard Hot 100. Though not as successful as "Summertime", "Ring My Bell" also became a top-40 hit, peaking at No. 20 on the Hot 100 and receiving a gold certification from the RIAA on November 26, 1991 for sales of 500,000 copies.

Single track listing

A-Side
"Ring My Bell" (Mr. Lee's 12" Mix) - 5:27
"Ring My Bell" (Hula And Fingers Club Mix) - 5:56
"Ring My Bell" (DJ Jazzy Jeff's Street Mix) - 5:00

B-Side
"Ring My Bell" (Instravibe) - 5:56
"Ring My Bell" (DJ Jazzy Jeff's Street Instrumental) - 5:00

Charts

Certifications

References

External links

1991 singles
1991 songs
DJ Jazzy Jeff & The Fresh Prince songs
Jive Records singles
Songs written by Will Smith